Nick Monson is a producer, songwriter, and instrumentalist, based in Los Angeles, CA.

Monson is known for his collaborations with Lady Gaga, beginning with Artpop, in which he co-produced 9 songs, including the lead single "Applause", which reached No.4 at US Mainstream Top 40 Chart.

Monson produced and co-wrote Selena Gomez's  "Good For You" (featuring A$AP Rocky), which reached No. 1 at US Top 40 and Top 5 on the Billboard Hot 100 Charts. In 2017, Monson was nominated for a Golden Globe for Best Original Song, along with co-writers Nick Jonas and Justin Tranter for their contribution to the Ferdinand Soundtrack with "Home".

He continued his work as both a writer and producer in 2018, credited on seven of the album's tracks on Lady Gaga's A Star Is Born soundtrack, which debuted at No. 1 on the Billboard 200 charts.

Monson has written and produced for several artists, including Britney Spears, Nick Jonas, Rag'n'Bone Man, Anne-Marie, Little Mix, and Julia Michaels.

Select production discography

References

External links 
 

Record producers from Los Angeles
Living people
Year of birth missing (living people)
Songwriters from California